Richard Jones (born May 13, 1976), better known by his stage names Fiend or International Jones, is an American rapper and producer best known for his time spent with Master P's No Limit Records. Fiend was also briefly signed to the label, Ruff Ryders Entertainment, and is currently signed to Jet Life under Warner Bros.

Music career

1995: I Won't Be Denied
On November 14, 1995, Fiend released his first album, titled I Won't Be Denied, via independent label Big Boy Records.

1997–98: No Limit Records and There's One in Every Family
In 1997 Fiend signed to Master P's record label No Limit Records and he appeared on Master P's Ghetto D and Mia X's Unlady Like before releasing his second album and first for No Limit, There's One in Every Family, in 1998. The album peaked at No. 8 on the Billboard 200 and number 1 on the Top R&B/Hip-Hop Albums charts. Also in that year, Fiend appeared on Snoop Dogg's single "Woof".  There Is One In Every Family was certified Gold by the RIAA on June 15, 1998.

1999: Street Life
In 1999, Fiend released his third album, Street Life. The album peaked at no. 15 on the Billboard 200 and no. 1 on the Top R&B/Hip-Hop Albums chart. In 1998 he married Carly Liber who is also known as Fiend; they did a duet together called "Fiend for the D".

2000–02: Fiend Entertainment, Ruff Ryders, Da Headbusaz and Can I Burn?
In the early 2000s Fiend disbanded from No Limit Records and started his own label titled Fiend Entertainment. On August 22, 2000, Fiend released his third album and first independent album titled Can I Burn?; it charted at No. 52 on the Top R&B/Hip-Hop Albums charts. In 2000 Fiend became a signed artist at Ruff Ryders Entertainment and appeared on the label's third compilation album, Ryde or Die Vol. 3: In the "R" We Trust, before leaving in 2001. In 2000, Fiend and former No Limit label mate Mr. Serv-On collaborated on Three 6 Mafia's song "Touched Wit It", which led Three 6 Mafia members DJ Paul and Juicy J to do a group album with Fiend to form a new group titled Da Headbusaz;the album is titled Dat's How It Happen to'M.

2003–06: Can I Burn? 2, Go Hard or Go Home and The Addiction: Hope Is Near
After the album, Fiend started his own label, Fiend Entertainment, and released three more albums. On May 13, 2003, Fiend released his fourth album and second independent album titled Can I Burn? 2; it charted at No. 55 on the Top R&B/Hip-Hop Albums charts. On August 31, 2004, Fiend released his fifth album and third independent album titled Go Hard or Go Home, which charted at No. 55 on the Top R&B/Hip-Hop Albums charts. On June 27, 2006, Fiend released his sixth album and fourth independent album titled The Addiction: Hope Is Near; it charted at No. 70 on the Top R&B/Hip-Hop Albums charts.

2011–present: Jet Life Recordings, Street Aint Safe, Vol. 3 and Heart of a Ghetto Boy: Volume 1
On May 24, 2011, during an interview Fiend announced that he had signed to fellow New Orleans, Louisiana rapper Currensy's record label Jet Life Recordings. Fiend also joined Currensy's new group Jet Life and announced that he had completed a sequel to the album There's One in Every Family, titled There’s One in Every Family Pt. II.

On July 10, 2015, Fiend released his eighth album, titled Street Aint Safe, Vol. 3, via Fiend Entertainment, Rapbay, Urbanlife Distribution. On August 21, 2015, Fiend released his ninth album and fifth independent album titled Heart of a Ghetto Boy: Volume 1 independently via Fiend Entertainment.

Other ventures

Record production
Fiend also produces music, having done production for songs on Jadakiss' Kiss tha Game Goodbye and former labelmate C-Murder's The Truest Shit I Ever Said.

Discography 

 I Won't Be Denied (1995)
 There's One in Every Family (1998)
 Street Life (1999)
 Can I Burn? (2000)
 Can I Burn? 2 (2003)
 Go Hard or Go Home (2004)
 The Addiction: Hope Is Near (2006)

See also
 No Limit Records
 No Limit Records discography
 Beats by the Pound

References

Interscope Records artists
No Limit Records artists
African-American male rappers
Rappers from New Orleans
Ruff Ryders artists
Southern hip hop musicians
Living people
1976 births
Gangsta rappers
21st-century American rappers
21st-century American male musicians
21st-century African-American musicians
20th-century African-American people